In chemistry, a metallofullerene is a molecule composed of a metal atom trapped inside a fullerene cage.

Simple metallofullerenes consist of a fullerene cage, typically , with one or two metal atoms trapped inside. The '@' symbol in the formula indicates that the atom(s) are encapsulated inside the cage, rather than being chemically bonded to it.

Fullerenes in a variety of sizes have been found to encapsulate metal atoms in this way.

Medical applications
One particular metallofullerene with gadolinium at its core is up to 40 times better as a contrast agent in magnetic resonance imaging scans for diagnostic imaging. Metallofullerenes may also provide ways to carry therapeutic radioactive ions to cancerous tissue.

See also
Endohedral fullerene

References

Fullerenes
Organometallic chemistry